Ioakimo "Lucky" Mulipola (born 28 May 1983) is a Samoan rugby union player. He is a winger who plays his rugby in New Zealand. Mulipola made his provincial debut in 2003 for Nelson Bays, and his international debut for Samoa in 2009.

Education
Mulipola attended Nelson College in 2002, and was the school's senior athletics champion that year.

Career

Nelson Bays
In 2003 Mulipola was introduced to NPC level rugby when he debuted for Nelson Bays against Manawatu. In three seasons playing for the union, he scored 97 points.

Tasman
Following the amalgamation of the Nelson Bays and Marlborough rugby unions in 2006, Mulipola played for the newly formed Tasman Makos in the Air New Zealand Cup. In nine appearances in 2006, he scored two tries.

Mulipola returned to the Makos, on loan from Otago, in September 2009.

Highlanders
Mulipola played for the Highlanders franchise from 2007 to 2009.

In his debut season for the Highlanders, as a draft player, Mulipola scored two tries. His best performance for the side was against the Waikato Chiefs in Queenstown when he stood up Roy Kinikinilau and then outpaced him to the corner, then minutes later he outjumped the former Highlander and sent Anton Oliver in for a five-pointer.

In 2008, Mulipola broke his arm in the first match of the Super 14 season against the Queensland Reds, and was ruled out of the remainder of the competition.

In 2009, he made only one appearance from the bench for the Highlanders.

Otago
Mulipola was signed by Otago in 2007, but missed the NPC competition that year after shoulder surgery.  In September 2009, while still on contract to Otago, Mulipola was loaned out to Tasman for the remainder of the 2009 Air New Zealand Cup, having not made an appearance for Otago all season.

In nine appearances for Otago, Mulipola scored three tries.

Samoa
Mulipola played two test matches for Samoa in 2009.  He made his debut against France on 21 November 2009, playing the full 80 minutes.  A week later he came off the bench against Italy.

References

Living people
1983 births
Samoan rugby union players
Otago rugby union players
Highlanders (rugby union) players
People from Tuamasaga
People educated at Nelson College
Samoa international rugby union players
Tasman rugby union players
Samoan emigrants to New Zealand
Nelson Bays rugby union players
Rugby union wings